Lomfjorden is a fjord at the eastern coast of Spitsbergen, Svalbard. Former names of the fjord include Bear Bay, Lamber Bay, Loom Bay, Lomme Fjord and Lommen baij.

References

Fjords of Spitsbergen